NDHU School of Management (NDHU SOM) is the business school of National Dong Hwa University (NDHU), a national research university in Hualien, Taiwan. Established in 1995, NDHU SOM offers undergraduate, MSc in Finance, MSc in Accounting, MIM, MBA, EMBA, and PhD's programs, as well as dual degree programs with institutions throughout the world.

NDHU SOM has six academic departments and one graduate institute, which is renowned for its consistent high rankings in the world for Tourism & Recreation, and Leisure Studies.

History 
NDHU School of Management traced its root back to Graduate Institute of Business Administration (BA) and Graduate Institute of Natural Resources Management (NRM) in 1994, with Lee Shao-Ju, Chair of Management Science at California State University, Los Angeles, as Founding Dean.

In 1996, the school founded Graduate Institute of International Business (IB), with Cheng Chih-Ming, Professor of Economics at Georgia Institute of Technology, as Founding Director. In 1998, the school establish Department of Accounting (ACC), with Chang Young-Hang, Professor of Accountancy at North Dakota State University. Following the school's rapid growth in the field of Natural Resources Management, the school expand its academic to established Graduate Institute of Tourism and Recreation Management (TRM) and Graduate Institute of Environmental Policy (EP) in 1999.

In 2001, NDHU School of Management extend its academic field into In Management Information System and E-commerce, founding Department of Information Management (IM), and establish the 1st PhD in Business Administration program in Eastern Taiwan.

In 2002, the school established Department of Finance, with Ken Hung, Professor of Accounting and Finance at Morgan State University, as Founding Chair. The NDHU Department of Finance later attract many notable scholars to work there, such as Lin Jin-Lung, the Board of Directors at Central Bank of Taiwan, Wen Yin-Kann, the Board of Directors at Central Bank of Taiwan, and Wu Chung-Shu, Chairman at Chung-Hua Institution for Economic Research.

In 2008, with merger of NDHU and NHUE, the Graduate Institute of Natural Resources Management and Graduate Institute of Environmental Policy were incorporated into newly-established NDHU College of Environmental Studies.

The establishment of NDHU School of Management set many records in Taiwan. The school was the first business school in Eastern Taiwan, as well as the first institution in Taiwan to award MBA Logistics Management, MSc Natural Resources Management, MSc Environmental Policy, MBA Tourism and Recreation Management, and PhD Natural Resources and Environmental Studies.

In 2022, the school was ranked as world's Top 150 institution in Hospitality & Tourism Management jointly with NDHU College of Environmental Studies by Academic Ranking of World Universities (ARWU).

Academic programs

Graduate

Doctor of Philosophy (PhD) 
The doctoral program (PhD) at NDHU School of Management is a full-time, in-residence program intended for students who plan scholarly careers involving research and teaching in management. There are six major tracks for PhD students follow at NDHU School of Management: Business Administration, International Business, Logistics Management, Information Management, Accounting, Finance, and Tourism & Recreation Management.

Master of Business Administration (MBA) 
There are 3 specialization MBA programs students can choose from:
MBA in Business Administration 
MBA in International Business 
MBA in Logistics Management

Master of Science (MS) 
There are 3 specialization M.S. programs students can choose from:
MSc in Finance 
MSc in Accounting 
MSc in Tourism, Recreation and Leisure Studies

Master of Information Management (MIM) 
The NDHU Master of Information Management (M.I.M.) is aiming to empower students with the necessary computer literacy to implement theoretical information management strategies and techniques into practical situations existing in the industry.

Executive MBA (EMBA) 
The NDHU School of Management also offers "NDHU EMBA" for those who have already reached a senior level in their organisations or professions, and are seeking to study part-time while maintaining their current role.

The school also offers Entrepreneur and Innovation MBA (EiMBA) for those aiming to advance it's capabilities in entrepreneurship, Innovation, and action in changes.

Undergraduate

Bachelor of Business Administration (BBA) 
NDHU School of Management offers 9 programs in different majors.
 Business Administration
 International Business
 Information Management
 Finance
 Accounting
 Management Science and Finance
 Accounting and Information Management
 Tourism, Recreation, and Leisure Studies
These programs operate on a modular system where students design their curricula to pace their studies. They may also take modules of their interest, subject to any prerequisite requirements and to the availability of modules.

Dual Degree 
The NDHU School of Management offers dual degree in partnership with leading universities across Asia, Europe, Australia, and North America:
College of Business, University of Texas at Arlington, United States
ESC Rennes School of Business, France
Griffith Business School (GBS), Griffith University, Australia
International Graduate School of Accounting Policy (IGSAP), Tohoku University, Japan
Graduate School of Economics (GSE), Nagasaki University, Japan
Business School, Middlesex University London, United Kingdom
Faculty of Business Studies, FH Aachen, Germany

Academics 
The NDHU School of Management offers programs at both the graduate and undergraduate levels, including Bachelor's degrees, Master's degree, and PhDs. Degrees are offered in the majors such as Business Administration, International Business, Information Management, Accounting, Finance, Logistics Management, and Tourism, Recreation and Leisure Studies.

Departments/Graduate Institute 
 Department of Business Administration (B.B.A., M.B.A., Ph.D.)
 Department of International Business (B.B.A.,M.B.A., Ph.D.)
 Department of Finance (B.F., M.S., Ph.D.)
 Department of Accounting (B.S., M.S., Ph.D.)
 Department of Information Management (B.B.A., M.I.M., Ph.D.)
 Department of Tourism, Recreation and Leisure Studies (B.S., M.S., Ph.D.)
 Graduate institute of Logistics Management (M.B.A., Ph.D.)

Research Centers 
The School is home to several research facilities, in the fields of Transportation Studies, FinTech Studies, Enterprise Resource Planning Studies, as well as New Economic Policy.
 East Center for Transportation Research & Development (ECTRD) 
 FinTech Big Data Research Center (FBDRC) 
 Finance.Innovation.Training Center (FITC) 
 Sustainable Finance Research Center (SFRC) 
 New Economic Policy Research Center (NEPRC) 
 Enterprise Resource Planning Center (ERPC)

Rank and reputation 
The NDHU School of Management strengths in both academics and research are reflected in its rankings and other accolades.

In 2021, ARWU Global Ranking of Academic Subjects ranked Hospitality & Tourism Management program in NDHU School of Management as Top 150 worldwide, holding the equal statue with Texas Tech University, Indiana University Bloomington, and University of Illinois at Urbana-Champaign.

NDHU SOM is ranked Top 6 among schools in Humanities and Social Sciences, Law, and Business (文法商) by Global Views Monthly (遠見雜誌), which is placed No.4 among Taiwanese public schools.

In 2010-2019, NDHU's Master of Science in Accounting program achieved 100% graduates received at least one offer from Big Four accounting firms for consecutive 9 years.

Partner Schools 
National Dong Hwa University School of Management has exchange partnerships with over 20 universities in different continents. In 2019, outbound & inbound exchange students have reached over 110. Partner schools include as follows:

References

External links
 
 
 

Business schools in Taiwan
National Dong Hwa University
Educational institutions established in 1995
1995 establishments in Taiwan